The Barnard Island Group is a protected area in the Cassowary Coast Region, Queensland, Australia.

These are islands with a fascinating geological past, dating back 420 million years.,

Six species of terns have been found nesting in the southern Barnard Islands, and twenty-three species of forest birds have a habitat here.

Geography 
Islands within the group include Jessie Island and Kent Island.

See also

 Protected areas of Queensland

References

Islands on the Great Barrier Reef
Protected areas established in 1994
1994 establishments in Australia
National parks of Far North Queensland
Uninhabited islands of Australia
Islands of Far North Queensland